An intermodal container, often called a shipping container, is a large standardized container designed and built for intermodal freight transport, meaning these containers can be used across different modes of transport – from ship to rail to truck – without unloading and reloading their cargo. Intermodal containers are primarily used to store and transport materials and products efficiently and securely in the global containerized intermodal freight transport system, but smaller numbers are in regional use as well. These containers are known under a number of names. Based on size alone, up to 95% of intermodal containers comply with ISO standards, and can officially be called ISO containers. Many other names are simply: container, cargo or freight container, shipping, sea or ocean container, container van or sea van, sea can or C can, or MILVAN, SEAVAN, or RO/RO. The also used term CONEX (Box) is technically incorrect carry-over usage of the name of an important predecessor of the international ISO containers, namely the much smaller prior steel CONEX boxes used by the U.S. Army.

First invented in the early 20th century, modern 40-foot intermodal containers proliferated during the 1960s and 1970s under the containerization innovations of the American shipping company SeaLand.  Just like cardboard boxes and pallets, these containers are a means to bundle cargo and goods into larger, unitized loads, that can be easily handled, moved, and stacked, and that will pack tightly in a ship or yard. Intermodal containers share a number of key construction features to withstand the stresses of intermodal shipping, to facilitate their handling and to allow stacking, as well as being identifiable through their individual, unique ISO 6346 reporting mark.

In 2012, there were about 20.5 million intermodal containers in the world of varying types to suit different cargoes. Containers have largely supplanted the traditional break bulk cargo – in 2010 containers accounted for 60% of the world's seaborne trade. The predominant alternative methods of transport carry bulk cargo whether gaseous, liquid, or solid; e.g., by bulk carrier or tank ship, tank car, or truck. For air freight, the lighter weight IATA-defined unit load devices are used.

History

Origins
Containerization has its origins in early coal mining regions in England beginning in the late 18th century. In 1766 James Brindley designed the box boat 'Starvationer' with ten wooden containers, to transport coal from Worsley Delph (quarry) to Manchester by Bridgewater Canal. In 1795, Benjamin Outram opened the Little Eaton Gangway, upon which coal was carried in wagons built at his Butterley Ironwork. The horse-drawn wheeled wagons on the gangway took the form of containers, which, loaded with coal, could be transshipped from canal barges on the Derby Canal, which Outram had also promoted.

By the 1830s, railroads were carrying containers that could be transferred to other modes of transport. The Liverpool and Manchester Railway in the UK was one of these, making use of "simple rectangular timber boxes" to convey coal from Lancashire collieries to Liverpool, where a crane transferred them to horse-drawn carriages. Originally used for moving coal on and off barges, "loose boxes" were used to containerize coal from the late 1780s, at places like the Bridgewater Canal. By the 1840s, iron boxes were in use as well as wooden ones. The early 1900s saw the adoption of closed container boxes designed for movement between road and rail.

Creation of international standards
The first international standard for containers was established by the Bureau International des Containers et du Transport Intermodal (B.I.C.) in 1933, and a second one in 1935, primarily for transport between European countries. American containers at this time were not standardized, and these early containers were not yet stackable – neither in the U.S. nor Europe. In November 1932, the first container terminal in the world was opened by the Pennsylvania Rail Road Company in Enola, Pennsylvania. Containerization was developed in Europe and the US as a way to revitalize rail companies after the Wall Street Crash of 1929, in New York, which resulted in economic collapse and a drop in all modes of transport.

Mid 20th century innovations
In April 1951 at Zürich Tiefenbrunnen railway station, the Swiss Museum of Transport and the Bureau International des Containers (BIC) held demonstrations of container systems for representatives from a number of European countries, and from the United States. A system was selected for Western Europe, based on the Netherlands' system for consumer goods and waste transportation called Laadkisten (lit. "Loading chests"), in use since 1934. This became the first post World War II European railway standard of the International Union of Railways – UIC-590, known as "pa-Behälter". It was implemented in the Netherlands, Belgium, Luxembourg, West Germany, Switzerland, Sweden and Denmark.

The use of standardized steel shipping containers began during the late 1940s and early 1950s, when commercial shipping operators and the US military started developing such units. In 1948 the U.S. Army Transportation Corps developed the "Transporter", a rigid, corrugated steel container, able to carry . After proving successful in Korea, the Transporter was developed into the Container Express (CONEX) box system in late 1952. CONEXes could be stacked three high, and protected their contents from the elements. By 1965 the US military used some 100,000 Conex boxes, and more than 200,000 in 1967, making this the first worldwide application of intermodal containers. Their invention made a major contribution to the globalization of commerce in the second half of the 20th century, dramatically reducing the cost of transporting goods and hence of long-distance trade.

From 1949 onwards, engineer Keith Tantlinger repeatedly contributed to the development of containers, as well as their handling and transportation equipment. In 1949, while at Brown Trailers Inc. of Spokane, Washington, he modified the design of their stressed skin aluminum 30-foot trailer, to fulfil an order of two-hundred  containers that could be stacked two high, for Alaska-based Ocean Van Lines. Steel castings on the top corners provided lifting and securing points.

In 1955, trucking magnate Malcom McLean bought Pan-Atlantic Steamship Company, to form a container shipping enterprise, later known as Sea-Land. The first containers were supplied by Brown Trailers Inc, where McLean met Keith Tantlinger, and hired him as vice-president of engineering and research. Under the supervision of Tantlinger, a new  x  x   Sea-Land container was developed, the length determined by the maximum length of trailers then allowed on Pennsylvanian highways. Each container had a frame with eight corner castings that could withstand stacking loads. Tantlinger also designed automatic spreaders for handling the containers, as well as the twistlock mechanism that connects with the corner castings.

Modern form
Containers in their modern 21st-century form first began to gain widespread use around 1956. Businesses began to devise a structured process to utilize and to get optimal benefits from the role and use of shipping containers. Over time, the invention of the modern telecommunications of the late 20th century made it highly beneficial to have standardized shipping containers and made these shipping processes more standardized, modular, easier to schedule, and easier to manage.

Two years after McLean's first container ship, the Ideal X, started container shipping on the US East Coast, Matson Navigation followed suit between California and Hawaii. In 1968, McLean began container service to South Vietnam for the US military with great success.

Modern ISO standards
ISO standards for containers were published between 1968 and 1970 by the International Maritime Organization. These standards allow for more consistent loading, transporting, and unloading of goods in ports throughout the world, thus saving time and resources. 
 
The International Convention for Safe Containers is a 1972 regulation by the Inter-governmental Maritime Consultative Organization on the safe handling and transport of containers. It decrees that every container travelling internationally be fitted with a CSC Safety-approval Plate. This holds essential information about the container, including age, registration number, dimensions and weights, as well as its strength and maximum stacking capability.

Impact of industry changes on workers
Longshoremen and related unions around the world struggled with this revolution in shipping goods. For example, by 1971 a clause in the International Longshoremen's Association (ILA) contract stipulated that the work of "stuffing" (filling) or "stripping" (emptying) a container within  of a port must be done by ILA workers, or if not done by ILA, that the shipper needed to pay royalties and penalties to the ILA. Unions for truckers and consolidators argued that the ILA rules were not valid work preservation clauses, because the work of stuffing and stripping containers away from the pier had not traditionally been done by ILA members. In 1980 the Supreme Court of the United States heard this case and ruled against the ILA.

Impact in worldwide supply shortage of 2020 to present
Some experts have said that the shipping containers have proven to have a downside, as exacerbating some of the economic and societal damage from the 2021 global supply chain crisis of 2020 and 2021, and the resulting shortages related to the COVID-19 pandemic. One problem is that the centralized, continuous shipping process made possible by the containers has now proven to be a liability of sorts; the reason is that if there is just one bottleneck, delay, or other breakdown at any point in the process, it can easily cause major delays everywhere up and down the supply chain. 

In January 2021, a shortage of shipping containers at ports caused shipping to be backlogged.

Marc Levinson, author of Outside the Box: How Globalization Changed from Moving Stuff to Spreading Ideas and The Box: How the Shipping Container Made the World Smaller and the World Economy Bigger, noted in an interview:

Because of delays in the process, it's taking a container longer to go from its origin to its final destination where it's unloaded, so the container is in use longer for each trip. You've just lost a big hunk of the total capacity because the containers can't be used as intensively. 

We've had in the United States an additional problem, which is that the ship lines typically charge much higher rates on services from Asia to North America than from North America to Asia. This has resulted in complaints, for example, from farmers and agricultural companies, that it's hard to get containers in some parts of the country because the ship lines want to ship them empty back to Asia, rather than letting them go to South Dakota and load over the course of several days. So we've had exporters in the United States complaining that they have a hard time finding a container that they can use to send their own goods abroad.

Description

Ninety percent of the global container fleet consists of "dry freight" or "general purpose" containers – both of standard and special sizes.
These typical containers are rectangular, closed box models, with doors fitted at one end, and made of corrugated weathering steel (commonly known as CorTen) with a plywood floor. Although corrugating the sheet metal used for the sides and roof contributes significantly to the container's rigidity and stacking strength, just like in corrugated iron or in cardboard boxes, the corrugated sides cause aerodynamic drag, and up to 10% fuel economy loss in road or rail transport, compared to smooth-sided vans.

By the end of 2013, high-cube 40 ft containers represented almost 50% of the world's maritime container fleet, according to Drewry's Container Census report.

ISO containers have castings with openings for twistlock fasteners at each of the eight corners, to allow gripping the box from above, below, or the side, and they can be stacked up to ten units high.

Moreover, vessels like the Marie Maersk no longer use separate stacks in their holds, and other stacks above deck – instead they maximize their capacity by stacking continuously from the bottom of the hull, to as much as twenty-one high. This requires automated planning, whereby heavy containers are systematically kept at the bottom of the stack, and light ones on top – not only to stabilize the ship, but also to prevent overloading and collapsing the bottom containers.

Regional intermodal containers, such as European, Japanese and U.S. domestic units however, are mainly transported by road and rail, and can frequently only be stacked up to two or three laden units high. Although the two ends are quite rigid, containers flex somewhat during transport.

Container capacity is often expressed in twenty-foot equivalent units (TEU, or sometimes teu). This is an approximate measure, wherein the height of the box is not considered. Two TEU are equivalent to one forty-foot equivalent unit (FEU).

In 2014 the global container fleet grew to a volume of 36.6 million TEU, based on Drewry Shipping Consultants' Container Census. Moreover, in 2014 for the first time in history 40-foot High-Cube containers accounted for the majority of boxes in service, measured in TEU. In 2019 it was noted by global logistics data analysis startup Upply that China's role as 'factory of the world' is further incentivizing the use of 40-foot containers, and that the computational standard 1 TEU boxes only make up 20% of units on major east–west liner routes, and demand for shipping them keeps dropping. In the 21st century, the market has shifted to using 40-foot high-cube dry and refrigerated containers more and more predominantly. Forty-foot units have become the standard to such an extent that the sea freight industry now charges less than 30% more for moving a 40-ft unit than for a 1 TEU box. Although 20-ft units mostly have heavy cargo, and are useful for stabilizing both ships and revenue, carriers financially penalize 1 TEU boxes by comparison.

For container manufacturers, 40-foot High-Cubes now dominate market demand both for dry and refrigerated units. Manufacturing prices for regular dry freight containers are typically in the range of $1750–$2000 U.S. per CEU (container equivalent unit), and about 90% of the world's containers are made in China. The average age of the global container fleet was a little over 5 years from end 1994 to end 2009, meaning containers remain in shipping use for well over 10 years.

Gooseneck tunnel
A gooseneck tunnel, an indentation in the floor structure, that meshes with the gooseneck on dedicated container semi-trailers, is a mandatory feature in the bottom structure of 1AAA and 1EEE (40- and 45-ft high-cube) containers, and optional but typical on standard height, forty-foot and longer containers.

Types 

Other than the standard, general purpose container, many variations exist for use with different cargoes. The most prominent of these are refrigerated containers (also called reefers) for perishable goods, that make up 6% of the world's shipping boxes. Tanks in a frame, for bulk liquids, account for another 0.75% of the global container fleet.

Although these variations are not of the standard type, they mostly are ISO standard containers – in fact the ISO 6346 standard classifies a broad spectrum of container types in great detail. Aside from different size options, the most important container types are:
 General-purpose dry vans, for boxes, cartons, cases, sacks, bales, pallets, drums, etc., Special interior layouts are known, such as:
 rolling-floor containers, for difficult-to-handle cargo
 garmentainers, for shipping garments on hangers (GOH)
 Ventilated containers. Essentially dry vans, but either passively or actively ventilated. For instance for organic products requiring ventilation.
 Temperature controlled – either insulated, refrigerated, and/or heated containers, for perishable goods
 Tank containers, for liquids, gases, or powders. Frequently these are dangerous goods, and in the case of gases one shipping unit may contain multiple gas bottles
 Bulk containers (sometimes bulktainers), either closed models with roof-lids, or hard or soft open-top units for top loading, for instance for bulk minerals. Containerized coal carriers and "bin-liners" (containers designed for the efficient road and rail transportation of rubbish from cities to recycling and dump sites) are used in Europe.
 Open-top and open-side containers, for instance for easy loading of heavy machinery or oversize pallets. Crane systems can be used to load and unload crates without having to disassemble the container itself. Open sides are also used for ventilating hardy perishables like apples or potatoes.
 Log cradles for cradling logs
 Platform based containers such as:
 flat-rack and bolster containers, for barrels, drums, crates, and any heavy or bulky out-of-gauge cargo, like machinery, semi-finished goods or processed timber. Empty flat-racks can either be stacked or shipped sideways in another ISO container 
 collapsible containers, ranging from flushfolding flat-racks to fully closed ISO and CSC certified units with roof and walls when erected.
 trash containers, for carrying trash bags and cans to and from Recycling factories and landfills.

Containers for offshore use have a few different features, like pad eyes, and must meet additional strength and design requirements, standards and certification, such as the DNV2.7-1 by Det Norske Veritas, LRCCS by Lloyd's Register, Guide for Certification of Offshore Containers by American Bureau of Shipping and the International standard ISO10855: Offshore containers and associated lifting sets, in support of IMO MSC/Circ. 860

A multitude of equipment, such as generators, has been installed in containers of different types to simplify logistics – see  for more details.

Swap body units usually have the same bottom corner fixtures as intermodal containers, and often have folding legs under their frame so that they can be moved between trucks without using a crane. However they frequently do not have the upper corner fittings of ISO containers, and are not stackable, nor can they be lifted and handled by the usual equipment like reach-stackers or straddle-carriers. They are generally more expensive to procure.

Specifications

Basic terminology of globally standardized intermodal shipping containers is set out in standard:
 ISO 830:(1999) Freight containers – Vocabulary, 2nd edition; last reviewed and confirmed in 2016.
From its inception, ISO standards on international shipping containers, consistently speak of them sofar as 'Series 1' containers – deliberately so conceived, to leave room for another such series of interrelated container standards in the future.

Basic dimensions and permissible gross weights of intermodal containers are largely determined by two ISO standards:
 ISO 668:2013–2020 Series 1 freight containers—Classification, dimensions and ratings
 ISO 1496-1:2013 Series 1 freight containers—Specification and testing—Part 1: General cargo containers for general purposes

Weights and dimensions of the most common (standardized) types of containers are given below. Forty-eight foot and fifty-three foot containers have not yet been incorporated in the latest, 2020 edition of the ISO 668. Draft Amendment 1 of ISO 668: 2020 – for the eighth edition – maintains this. Given the average container lifespan, the majority of the global container fleet have not caught up with this change yet. Moreover, U.S. highways cannot handle such heavy fully laden containers yet, including the mass of truck (and trailer).

Values vary slightly from manufacturer to manufacturer, but must stay within the tolerances dictated by the standards. Empty weight (tare weight) is not determined by the standards, but by the container's construction, and is therefore indicative, but necessary to calculate a net load figure, by subtracting it from the maximum permitted gross weight.

The bottom row in the table gives the legal maximum cargo weights for U.S. highway transport, and those based on use of an industry common tri-axle chassis. Cargo must also be loaded evenly inside the container, to avoid axle weight violations. In the U.S., containers loaded up to the rail cargo weight limit cannot move over the road, as they will exceed the U.S.  highway limit.

Tests 
Here are examples of tests from ISO 1496-1:2013 (Stacking, Lifting, Restraint, wall, roof and floor Strength, Rigidity).

Other sizes

'Pallet wide' containers

Europe

As a result, while being virtually interchangeable:

A 20-foot PW can load 15 Euro-pallets – four more, or 36% better than the normal 11 pallets in an ISO-standard 20-foot unit
A 40-foot PW can load 30 Euro-pallets – five more, or 20% better than the 25 pallets in a standard 40-foot unit, and
A 45-foot PW can load 34 Euro-pallets – seven more, or 26% better than 27 in a standard 45-foot container.

Some pallet-wides are simply manufactured with the same, ISO-standard floor structure, but with the side-panels welded in, such that the ribs/corrugations are embossed outwards, instead of indenting to the inside.

Many sea shipping providers in Europe allow these on board, as their external width overhangs over standard containers are sufficiently minor that they fit in the usual interlock spaces in ship's holds, as long as their corner-castings patterns (both in the floor and the top) still match with regular 40-foot units, for stacking and securing.

45-foot containers
The  pallet-wide high-cube container has gained particularly wide acceptance, as these containers can replace the  swap bodies that are common for truck transport in Europe. The EU has started a standardization for pallet wide containerization in the European Intermodal Loading Unit (EILU) initiative.

Australia

Although the below described sizes are not exclusively used in the U.S. (they are also used in cargo traffic across the borders, into Canada and Mexico), they are predominantly United States initiatives.

North America domestic containers
48-foot containers
This size was introduced by container shipping company APL (formerly American President Lines) in 1986, and is used domestically in North America on road and rail, but can only be transported on deck by ships. This size being  longer and  wider has 29% more volume capacity than the standard 40-ft High-Cube, yet costs of moving it by truck or rail are almost the same.

53-foot containers

General purpose 53' containers were introduced in the United States in 1989, and are used both in the US and Canada, mainly for domestic road and rail transport. They are considered High-Cubes, based on their  ISO-standard height. Their width of  however makes them  wider than ISO-standard containers. These large boxes have 60% more capacity than 40' containers, enabling shippers to consolidate more cargo into fewer containers.

Generally, North American 53-foot containers were not constructed strong enough to endure the rigors of ocean transport, but in 2007 container carrier American President Lines introduced the first 53-foot ocean-capable containers. All new, reinforced 53-foot boxes were built specifically for international trade and designed to withstand ocean voyages on its South China-to-Los Angeles service. In 2013 however, APL stopped offering vessel space for 53-foot containers on its trans-Pacific ships. Nevertheless, In 2015 both Crowley and TOTE Maritime each announced the construction of their respective second combined container and roll-on/roll-off ships for Puerto Rico trade, with the specific design to maximize cubic cargo capacity by carrying 53-foot,  containers. Within Canada, Oceanex offers 53-foot-container ocean service to and from Newfoundland. Fifty-three-foot containers are also being used on some Asia Pacific international shipping routes.

60-foot containers
In May 2017, Canadian Tire and Canadian Pacific Railway announced deployment of the first 60-foot intermodal containers in North America. The containers allow Canadian Tire to increase the volume of goods shipped per container by 13%.

Small containers
The ISO 668 standard has so far never standardized  containers to be the same height as so-called "Standard-height", 20- and 40-foot containers. By the ISO standard, 10-foot (and previously included 5-ft and 6-ft boxes) are only of unnamed, 8-foot (2.44 m) height. But industry makes 10-foot units more frequently of  height, to mix, match (and stack) better in a fleet of longer, 8 ft 6 in tall containers.

 U.S. military 
The United States military continues to use small containers, strongly reminiscent of their Transporter and Conex boxes of the 1950s and 1960s. These mostly comply with (previous) ISO standard dimensions, or are a direct derivative thereof. Current terminology of the United States armed forces calls these small containers Bicon, Tricon and Quadcon, with sizes that correspond with (previous) ISO 668 standard sizes 1D, 1E and 1F respectively. Tricons and Quadcons however have to be coupled transversely – either three or four in a row – to be stackable with twenty foot containers. Their length of  corresponds to the width of a standard 20-foot container, which is why there are forklift pockets at their ends, as well as in the sides of these boxes, and the doors only have one locking bar each. Only the first conforms to ISO-668 standard dimensions (size 1F).

 Japan: 12-foot containers 

Reporting mark

Each container is allocated a standardized ISO 6346 reporting mark (ownership code), four letters long ending in either U, J or Z, followed by six digits and a check digit. B.I.C.) in France, hence the name "BIC-Code" for the intermodal container reporting mark. So far there exist only four-letter BIC-Codes ending in "U".

The placement and registration of BIC Codes is standardized by the commissions TC104 and TC122 in the JTC1 of the ISO which are dominated by shipping companies. Shipping containers are labelled with a series of identification codes that includes the manufacturer code, the ownership code, usage classification code, UN placard for hazardous goods and reference codes for additional transport control and security.

Following the extended usage of pallet-wide containers in Europe the EU started the Intermodal Loading Unit (ILU) initiative. This showed advantages for intermodal transport of containers and swap bodies. This led to the introduction of ILU-Codes defined by the standard EN 13044 which has the same format as the earlier BIC-Codes. The International Container Office BIC agreed to only issue ownership codes ending with U, J or Z. The new allocation office of the UIRR (International Union of Combined Road-Rail Transport Companies) agreed to only issue ownership reporting marks for swap bodies ending with A, B, C, D or K – companies having a BIC-Code ending with U can allocate an ILU-Code ending with K having the same preceding letters. Since July 2011 the new ILU codes can be registered, beginning with July 2014 all intermodal ISO containers and intermodal swap bodies must have an ownership code and by July 2019 all of them must bear a standard-conforming placard.

Handling

Containers are transferred between rail, truck, and ship by container cranes at container terminals. Forklifts, reach stackers, straddle carriers, container jacks and cranes may be used to load and unload trucks or trains outside of container terminals. Swap bodies, sidelifters, tilt deck trucks, and hook trucks allow transfer to and from trucks with no extra equipment.

ISO-standard containers can be handled and lifted in a variety of ways by their corner fixtures, but the structure and strength of 45-foot (type E) containers limits their tolerance of side-lifting, nor can they be forklifted, based on ISO 3874 (1997).

Transport

Containers can be transported by container ship, truck and freight trains as part of a single journey without unpacking. Units can be secured in transit using "twistlock" points located at each corner of the container. Every container has a unique BIC code painted on the outside for identification and tracking, and is capable of carrying up to 20–25 tonnes.  Costs for transport are calculated in twenty-foot equivalent units (TEU).

Rail

When carried by rail, containers may be carried on flatcars or well cars. The latter are specially designed for container transport, and can accommodate double-stacked containers. However, the loading gauge of a rail system may restrict the modes and types of container shipment. The smaller loading gauges often found in European railroads will only accommodate single-stacked containers. In some countries, such as the United Kingdom, there are sections of the rail network through which high-cube containers cannot pass, or can pass through only on well cars. On the other hand, Indian Railways runs double-stacked containers on flatcars under 25 kV overhead electrical wires.

Sea
About 90% of non-bulk cargo worldwide is transported by container, and the largest container ships can carry over 19,000 TEU (Twenty-Foot Equivalent, or how many 20 foot containers can fit on a ship). Between 2011 and 2013, an average of 2,683 containers were reported lost at sea. Other estimates go up to 10,000; of these 10% are expected to contain chemicals toxic to marine life. Various systems are used for securing containers on ships. Losses of containers at sea are low.

Air
Containers can also be transported in planes, as seen within intermodal freight transport. However, transporting containers in this way is typically avoided due to the cost of doing such and the lack of availability of planes which can accommodate such awkwardly sized cargo.

There are special aviation containers, smaller than intermodal containers, called unit load devices.

Securing and security
Securing containers and contents

There are many established methods and materials for stabilizing and securing intermodal containers loaded on ships, as well as the internal cargo inside the boxes. Conventional restraint methods and materials such as steel strapping and wood blocking and bracing have been around for decades and are still widely used. Polyester strapping and lashing, and synthetic webbings are also common today. Dunnage bags (also known as "air bags") are used to keep unit loads in place.

Flexi-bags can also be directly loaded, stacked in food-grade containers. Indeed, their standard shape fills the entire ground surface of a 20 ft ISO container.

Security

Intermodal containers which contain valuables can be the target of break-ins and burglary when left unattended. In these cases, the container may be fitted with a security system consisting of a motion detector and panel inside the container. The panel can trigger a siren, strobe, or light to deter intruders, or use a radio signal to alert security guards.

Items that were packed incorrectly may come loose and cause a false response from an inside motion detector. If criminals break in by  cutting through a wall of the container, the obstructed motion detector becomes useless. Tomographic motion detectors work well in intermodal containers because they do not require a line of sight to detect motion. The entire container is covered by a volumetric sensing mesh that is not blocked by equipment or inventory. Tomographic motion detection is not prone to misdetection due to dirt buildup as is the case for beams and infrared sensors.

 Non-shipping uses 

Containerized equipment

Container-sized units are also often used for moving large pieces of equipment to temporary sites. Specialised containers are particularly attractive to militaries already using containerisation to move much of their freight around. Shipment of specialized equipment in this way simplifies logistics and may prevent identification of high value equipment by enemies. Such systems may include command and control facilities, mobile operating theatres or even missile launchers (such as the Russian 3M-54 Klub surface-to-surface missile).

Complete water treatment systems can be installed in containers and shipped around the world.

Electric generators can be permanently installed in containers to be used for portable power.

Repurposing

Half the containers that enter the United States leave empty. Their value in the US is lower than in China, so they are sometimes used for other purposes. This is typically but not always at the end of their voyaging lives. The US military often used its Conex containers as on-site storage, or easily transportable housing for command staff and medical clinics. Nearly all of the more than 150,000 Conex containers shipped to Vietnam remained in the country, primarily as storage or other mobile facilities. Permanent or semi-permanent placement of containers for storage is common. Repurposing used shipping containers is increasingly a practical solution to both social and ecological problems.

Shipping container architecture employs used shipping containers as the main framing of modular home designs, where the steel may be an integrated part of the design, or be camouflaged into a traditional looking home. They have also been used to make temporary shops, cafes, and computer datacenters, e.g. the Sun Modular Datacenter.

Intermodal containers are not strong enough for conversion to underground bunkers without additional bracing, as the walls cannot sustain much lateral pressure and will collapse. Also, the wooden floor of many used containers could contain some fumigation residues, rendering them unsuitable as confined spaces, such as for prison cells or bunkers. Cleaning or replacing the wood floor can make these used containers habitable, with proper attention to such essential issues as ventilation and insulation.

International standards

 ASTM D5728-00 Standard Practices for Securement of Cargo in Intermodal and Unimodal Surface Transport
 ISO 668:2013 Series 1 freight containers – Classification, dimensions and ratings
 ISO 830:1999 Freight containers – Vocabulary
 ISO 1161:1984 Series 1 freight containers – Corner fittings – Specification
 ISO 1496 – Series 1 freight containers – Specification and testing
 ISO 1496-1:2013 – Part 1: General cargo containers for general purposes
 ISO 1496-2:2008 – Part 2: Thermal containers
 ISO 1496-3:1995 – Part 3: Tank containers for liquids, gases, and pressurized dry bulk
 ISO 1496-4:1991 – Part 4: Non-pressurized container for dry bulk
 ISO 1496-5:1991 – Part 5: Platform and platform based containers
 ISO 2308:1972 Hooks for lifting freight containers of up to 30 tonnes capacity – Basic requirements
 ISO 3874:1997 Series 1 freight containers – Handling and securing
 ISO 6346:1995 Freight containers – Coding, identification and marking
 ISO 9897:1997 Freight containers – Container equipment data exchange (CEDEX) – General communication codes
 ISO/TS 10891:2009 Freight containers – Radio frequency identification (RFID) – Licence plate tag
 ISO 14829:2002 Freight containers – Straddle carriers for freight container handling – Calculation of stability
 ISO 17363:2007 Supply chain applications of RFID – Freight containers
 ISO/PAS 17712:2006 Freight containers – Mechanical seals
 ISO 18185-2:2007 Freight containers – Electronic seals

See also

 
  Mall
 Conflat
 Container chassis
 
 
 
 
 Double-stack rail transport
 
 Inter-box connector
 
 
 
 
 
  Mall
 
 
 
 
 
 
 

Notes

References

  page 8, page 14, page 18, page 20, page 26.
 

Further reading
 Donovan, Arthur & Bonney, Joseph. The Box That Changed the World, East Windsor, New Jersey, Commonwealth Business Media, 2006 
 George, Rose. Ninety Percent of Everything: Inside Shipping, the Invisible Industry That Puts Clothes on Your Back, Gas in Your Car, and Food on Your Plate (2013), describes typical sea voyage excerpt and text search
 International Organization for Standardization (ISO), Freight containers, Volume 34 of ISO standards handbook, International Organization for Standardization, 4th edition, 2006. 
 Levinson, Marc.  The Box: How the Shipping Container Made the World Smaller and the World Economy Bigger'', Princeton, N.J. : Princeton University Press, 2006.  [https://books.google.com/books?id=WDN5omS5LO0C excerpt and text search

External links

 Bureau International des Containers et du Transport Intermodal
 International Convention for Safe Containers (Geneva, 2 December 1972)
 Track and trace by Shipping Containers
 Track and trace Container Cargos
 Freight container types and sizes summary
 Container Handbook – by GDV, the collective of German insurance companies
 ISO Containers – ISO Freight Containers

 
Modularity
Port infrastructure